The 1979 ICC Trophy was a limited overs cricket tournament held in England between 22 May and 21 June 1979. It was the inaugural ICC Trophy tournament to be staged, with matches between the 15 participating teams played over 60 overs a side and with white clothing and red balls. All matches were played in the Midlands.

The tournament served as the Cricket World Cup qualification process – the two finalists, Sri Lanka and Canada, qualified to take part in the 1979 World Cup. The World Cup began on 9 June, just three days after Sri Lanka and Canada qualified for it by winning their ICC Trophy semi-finals. The ICC Trophy final was held on 21 June at Worcestershire's ground at New Road, two days before the World Cup final. Sri Lanka won the first ICC Trophy defeating Canada in the final.

East Africa who played in the first World Cup did not qualify this time, which meant there would be no nation from the African region participating in the 1979 World Cup.

Squads

Competition format

The 15 teams were divided into three groups of five. Each team played each other team in its group once in matches played between 22 May and 4 June, scoring four points for a win and two for a no-result (match started but not finished) or abandoned entirely without a ball being bowled. The three group winners and the team with the fourth-highest points total after the group stage went forward to the semi-finals, the top team playing the fourth-ranked side and the team with the second-highest number of points playing the third. Where teams finished with equal points totals, run rate was used to separate them.

Group matches

Note: A number of matches used their allotted reserve day.

Group A

A close opening-day match saw Singapore manage a nail-biting one-wicket victory over Argentina. The Argentines had made a respectable 154/9 from their 60 overs, their total restricted by a fine 5–44 from Young Ken Sen. In reply, Singapore slumped to 43/4 before the middle order steadied the ship, Goh Swee Heng proving the key man with 40 not out as they overhauled their opponents' total with four balls to spare.

In the other Group A game, there was no result between East Africa and Papua New Guinea, though the Papuans had struggled to 101/8 from 40.2 overs by the time the match was called off, with only Api Leka's 51 not out staving off complete collapse.

Argentina's 147 proved to be inadequate, Ferguson top scoring with 44, as East Africa won by five wickets with more than six overs in hand, Narendra Thakker making 44 not out.
 

Bermuda's win over PNG was a one-sided affair, PNG losing their last four wickets for five runs to collapse to 90 all out and the Bermudians reaching 92/3 from a mere 23.2 overs.

The game between Argentina and Papua New Guinea was curtailed by rain, the South Americans having reached an unconvincing 86/4 after 33 overs when play was called off.

Match was ruined by the weather and there was no play at all between Bermuda and Singapore.

Argentina lost wickets at regular intervals against Bermuda to make an inadequate 81 in their innings, future Scotland List A bowler Clarence Parfitt taking 3–16; their opponents raced to their target, for the loss of just one wicket, inside 16 overs.

Singapore crawled to 131/5 from their full 60 overs, although East Africa took more than 52 overs to record a five-wicket win.

East Africa's 94 all out (Winston Trott 3–8) fell well short of a competitive total and Winston Reid's undefeated 59 ensured a simple nine-wicket triumph for Bermuda.

Papua New Guinea put up a good performance in the other match, making 174 despite 4–30 for Young Ken Sen and then reducing Singaporeans to 15/5, a position from which they never recovered; Singapore were eventually bowled out for a mere 87 to lose by 87 runs.

Group B 

Canada proved too strong for Malaysia, Rasiah Ratnalingham's excellent analysis of 12–5–18–3 not enough to stop the Canadians winning by 44 runs thanks to 77 from Cecil Marshall and 4–33 from John Vaughan.

A strong Denmark side overpowered Fiji, Ole Mortensen taking 4–15 from 12 overs in a Fijian total of just 89 which the Danes cruised past with almost 25 overs to spare; Henrik Mortensen made 52 not out.

Bangladesh were in desperate trouble against Fiji after good bowling (Konrote 3–14 from nine overs) reduced them to 54/8, but their last two wickets added 49 and their final total of 103 proved to be enough as they won by 22 runs thanks to Ashraful Haque, who destroyed the Fijian line-up with a superb haul of 7–23, figures which would stand as the best return in the ICC Trophy until 1994.

Malaysia made 150 from their 60 overs, helped by no less than 27 extras (including 14 wides), but Denmark's batting was too strong, Henrik Mortensen and Carsten Morild adding an unbroken partnership of 119 to guide the Scandinavians to a straightforward seven-wicket win.

Canada (190/9) recorded a solid 49-run win over Bangladesh (141), Franklyn Dennis top-scoring with 61 and captain Garnet Brisbane making 34. For the Bangladeshis, Jahangir Shah took 4–17, but it was not enough to affect the outcome of the match as only two players passed 20.

The match between Fiji and Malaysia was abandoned without a ball being bowled.

Malaysia started reasonably to reach 60/2 against Bangladesh, but wickets tumbled regularly thereafter and in the end they could manage only 114 (Daulat Zaman 4–23) and Jahangir Shah's unbeaten 39 saw the Bangladeshis home by seven wickets.

Canada's Martin Stead took 4–16 and helped reduce Denmark from 74/2 to 118 all out, but they collapsed themselves in reply, reaching just 72 (Carsten Morild 4–12) to lose by 46 runs.

A close match saw Denmark (165/8) beat Bangladesh (155) by 10 runs to record a perfect record of four wins from four games, thanks largely to 74 from Keld Kristensen and some economical bowling (12–5–16–3) by Torben Neilsen.

The match was a somewhat less gripping affair, with Canada winning by 56 runs, their 209/6 (Vaughan 68) being more than enough for Fiji, for whom no batsman passed Browne's 34 as they were bowled out for 153.

Group C

The United States' total of 126 all out seemed vulnerable, with only three batsmen reaching 20 and R Reuben claiming 4–37, but once Israel had slumped to 47/7 in reply there was no way back, despite a defiant 24 not out from number nine Kanpol, and they lost by 41 runs.

In the Group C match played in which Wales (170/7) beat the Netherlands (59/2 off 30 overs) by 15 runs on countback. Ex-Middlesex batsman Jeffris Hopkins made the difference with 71.

The Netherlands(107/2) cruised to an untroubled eight-wicket victory over Israel (105), thanks largely to five dismissals (3ct, 2st) by Rene Schoonheim and to Bakker's 60 not out. In the other game, a reasonable American total of 168 was boosted by a fifth-wicket stand of 90 between Stuger (48) and former first-class cricketer Kamran Rasheed, who hit 44.

Despite the loss of two early wickets, a fine 76 not out from future Test batsman Roy Dias ensured that there were no real alarms for the Sri Lankans as they won by six wickets with 20 overs to go.

Sri Lanka against Wales was called off with no play having been possible.

Netherlands against United States was called off with no play having been possible.

Wales piled up a daunting 234/5 against Israel, Jeffris Hopkins hitting 92 and Geoffrey Williams 67. Israel were never in the game after they slipped to 59/5, before restoring some respectability with a sixth-wicket stand of 61 thanks to Kessel (32) and Solomon (28); they eventually made 143/9 to lose by 91 runs.

The match, Duleep Mendis scored 51 and five other scores between 21 and 28 saw Sri Lanka to 212/8; Bakker made 74 in the Dutch reply but received little support and Sri Lanka won by 45 runs.

The match that was played, between the United States and Wales, was an exciting affair. Anil Lashkari hit 73 to propel the Americans to a competitive total of 190, in reply to which the Welsh were going well at 139/4 with Geoff Ellis making 56. However, an excellent spell of bowling from Kamran Rasheed, more usually a wicket-keeper, turned the game; he took 5–17 from eight overs and Wales were dismissed for 182 with seven balls to go to lose by just eight runs.

Sri Lanka refused on political grounds to play against Israel, meaning that the latter won by a walkover and instead played their hosts Kenilworth Cricket Club in a friendly.

Semi-finals

First semi-final: Sri Lanka v Denmark 

Sri Lanka's powerful batting line-up saw their team through to a huge total of 318/7, including 88 from Dias, 68 from Mendis and 45 from captain Anura Tennekoon. The Danes began reasonably well in pursuit of such a daunting target, reaching 96/3 at one stage before wickets began to tumble and Denmark declined to 110 all out, a crushing 208-run loss. Bandula Warnapura (3–22), Somachandra de Silva (3–20) and Sudath Pasqual (3–7) were the pick of Sri Lanka's bowlers.

Second semi-final: Bermuda v Canada

Batting first, Bermuda were bowled out for 181 off 58.1 overs with no player making a big impression, but solid contributions from John Tucker (who made his team's top score of 49) and Gladstone Browne (34). In reply, Canada's innings began disastrously as they were reduced to 36/4, but once Bryan Mauricette (72 not out) and Tariq Javed (47) had added 111 for the sixth wicket the result was no longer in doubt and the Canadians recorded a four-wicket win with 13 balls to spare.

Final 

A high-scoring match saw 588 runs scored for the loss of 13 wickets, with Sri Lanka emerging victorious by the comfortable margin of 60 runs. Mendis hit 66 and Sunil Jayasinghe 64, with four other players passing 30, as the Sri Lankans made 324/8, the highest total of the entire tournament. Canada recovered from 34/2 to reach 182/3 at one stage with Vaughan making 80 and Marshall 55. Despite having wickets in hand, however, they could not keep up with the required run rate, ending up well short of their target on 264/5.

Statistics

Most runs
The top five run scorers (total runs) are included in this table.

Source: CricketArchive

Most wickets

The top five wicket takers are listed in this table, listed by wickets taken and then by bowling average.

Source: CricketArchive

References

External links
 ICC Trophy 1979

ICC Trophy
ICC Trophy
ICC World Cup Qualifier
International cricket competitions in England